The Mediterranean Book Festival, stylized as mfk, is an annual book fair held in Split, Croatia. The inaugural edition of the festival was held between 3–7 May 2017 in the Gripe Sports Center. The festival is organized by the Association of Publishers and Booksellers of the Croatian Chamber of Economy.

See also 
Interliber

Footnotes

References 

Book fairs in Croatia
Events in Split, Croatia